The Kulspruta m/39 (ksp m/39) is the Swedish version of the ZB vz. 26 machine gun.

In 1939, ZB vz. 26s were purchased from Carl Gustafs Stads Gevärsfaktori. These featured a quick-change, finned barrel for enhanced cooling, box magazine, and bipod. They were chambered in 8×63mm patron m/32. The tank-mounted variant used a 250 round belt. Available in both left and right hand feeds, the left hand feed being used in the Combat Vehicle 90. 

After World War II ended, most of the guns were converted to 6.5×55mm, and in 1975 were re-barreled to 7.62×51mm NATO.

References

7.62×51mm NATO machine guns
8 mm machine guns
Medium machine guns
Machine guns of Sweden